Priargunsky District is an administrative and municipal district (raion), one of the thirty-one in Zabaykalsky Krai, Russia. It is located in the southeast of the krai, and borders with Kalgansky District in the north, and with Krasnokamensky District in the south. Its administrative center is the urban locality (an urban-type settlement) of Priargunsk. Population:  26,959 (2002 Census);  The population of Priargunsk accounts for 33.8% of the district's total population.

History
The district was established on March 30, 1962.

References

Notes

Sources

Districts of Zabaykalsky Krai
States and territories established in 1962

